"Ich will" (German for "I Want") is a song by German Neue Deutsche Härte band Rammstein from their third studio album Mutter. It was originally released in Germany on 10 September 2001, but many channels did not air the music video (which was to debut on U.S. television the next evening) as it was released the day before the September 11 attacks. The German single contains a live cover of the Ramones song "Pet Sematary" sung by Rammstein keyboardist Christian "Flake" Lorenz.

Music video
The music video of "Ich will" features the band members staging a bank robbery, making it seem as realistic as possible. The video shows both the robbery and its aftermath, and moves between these two scenes.

During the robbery scenes, the band is shown entering a bank wearing stockings over their heads, except for Flake, who has a very large and elaborate bomb strapped to his chest. They quickly remove their masks and head for the front desk. A bank employee reaches for the panic button, but she is seen by Richard, who presses her hand against the button, intentionally triggering the alarm. The woman faints, and Richard dances with her unconscious body until Ollie confirms that the police and media have arrived. The group continues to terrorize the hostages and vandalize the bank, while also fantasizing about the media storm when they exit. In another room, Till is giving a live interview to the press, who appear to be slain in the next scene, though the broadcast continues. As the band (excluding Flake) exit the bank unarmed, they are swarmed by members of the Spezialeinsatzkommando instead of the media as anticipated. Despite this, the band seems to revel in the attention they are getting, and shortly after the timer on Flake's bomb reaches zero. The video quickly flicks through a series of short clips from some of Rammstein's other music videos, then comes to an end.

During the aftermath scenes, the band (Flake excluded) emerges from a police bus wearing shackles and prison attire. They are escorted by guards down a red carpet surrounded by a large cheering crowd and many cameras, toward a podium where they receive a Goldene Kamera (Golden Camera) award, a German version of the Emmy award. Behind the podium is the main entrance of the bank they destroyed earlier, with a large sepia picture of Flake over the door. (most of the "aftermath" is shown at the beginning of the clip, although it is also revisited later).

In an interview, Rammstein described the music video of "Ich will" as being a demonstration of the media's obsession with a good story, as well as an illustration of the immortality that can be achieved by those who commit wrongs. The video was filmed in Berlin in the former State Council of the German Democratic Republic building (Staatsratsgebäude) which now houses the European School of Management and Technology.

Live story
Along with "Nebel", "Ich will" was the only song from Mutter that was not played live in its demo form in the concert for members of the Fan Area in April 2000. Instead, it debuted on 1 May 2001, in another concert for members of the Fan Area. When played live, explosions are part of the performance, and it usually closes the show during festivals. It has been played paired with "Sonne" during the encores in every Rammstein concert up until Made in Germany 1995–2011 (tour), where "Sonne" opened the show while "Ich will" maintained its position in the encore.

Track listing
Maxi-single
 Ich will (Album Version) - 3:37
 Ich will (Live Preussag Arena, Hannover, Germany on 1 June 2001) - 4:17
 Ich will (Westbam Mix) - 6:19
 Ich will (Paul van Dyk Mix) - 6:13
 Pet Sematary (Performed live with Clawfinger) - 6:31
 Ich will (Live CD-R Track) - 4:05
 Comes as a 2-track CD with Ich will (Album Version) and Ich will (Live).

UK CD Part 1 (Red Cover)
 Ich will (Radio Edit)
 Links 2 3 4 (Clawfinger Geradeaus Remix) - 4:28
 Du hast (Remix By Jacob Hellner) - 6:44
 Ich will (Video) - 4:05

UK CD Part 2 (Green Cover)
 Ich will (Radio Edit)
 Halleluja - 3:45
 Stripped (Heavy Mental Mix By Charlie Clouser) - 5:18

UK DVD Part 3 (Orange Cover)
Ich will (Live Video Version)
4 x 30 Seconds Video Clips
 Bück dich
 Rammstein
 Wollt ihr das Bett in Flammen sehen?
 Asche zu Asche
Photo Gallery (10 Shots)
2 x Audio Tracks
 Feuerräder (Live Demo Version 1994)
 Rammstein (Live)

Charts

Certifications

References

External links
Rammstein - Ich Will (Official Video)

2001 singles
Rammstein songs
Protest songs
2000 songs
Songs written by Paul Landers
Songs written by Till Lindemann
Songs written by Christian Lorenz
Songs written by Christoph Schneider
Songs written by Richard Z. Kruspe
Songs written by Oliver Riedel